The 1971 NAIA Division I football season was the 16th season of college football sponsored by the NAIA and the second season of the league's two-division structure. The season was played from August to November 1971 and culminated in the 1971 NAIA Champion Bowl, played on December 11, 1971 at Legion Field in Birmingham, Alabama. Livingston defeated  in the Champion Bowl, 14–12, to win their first NAIA national title.

Conference standings

Postseason

See also
 1971 NAIA Division II football season
 1971 NCAA University Division football season
 1971 NCAA College Division football season

References

 
NAIA Football National Championship